The Dignity Health Sports Park is a tennis center in Carson, Los Angeles, California, United States. It is adjacent to the soccer stadium of the same name, which is home to the LA Galaxy of Major League Soccer (MLS).

In 2019, Dignity Health purchased the naming rights to the venue.

Events
The record capacity is 11,168, set on May 17, 2016, for a Bernie Sanders campaign rally.

2028 Summer Olympics
During the 2028 Summer Olympics, the venue will host the tennis competition.

See also
 List of tennis stadiums by capacity

References

External links
 The Home Depot Center Tennis Stadium website
 Davis Cup, (Usa vs Croatia) March 2005
 concert
 full complex
 central court 2006
 Central court 2006, expedition match Sampras

Tennis venues in California
Sports venues in Greater Los Angeles
Sports venues in Carson, California
Venues of the 2028 Summer Olympics
Olympic tennis venues